Kateryna Dudchenko (born 14 October 1996 in Ukraine) is a Ukrainian rower. She won a bronze medal at the 2022 European Championships where she finished third in women's quadruple sculls in team with Daryna Verkhohliad, Nataliya Dovhodko, and Yevheniya Dovhodko.

References

External links 
 

1996 births
Living people
Ukrainian female rowers
20th-century Ukrainian women
21st-century Ukrainian women